Linda Morais (born 31 July 1993) is a wrestler competing for Canada. 
She won a gold medal in the 59 kg freestyle at the 2019 World Wrestling Championships and a bronze medal in the 60 kg freestyle at the 2016 World Wrestling Championships. She won one of the bronze medals in the 68kg event at the 2022 World Wrestling Championships held in Belgrade, Serbia. She is also a two-time (2018 & 2016) World University Championship gold medallist.

Morais placed first in the 57 kg freestyle at the 2019 Canadian Wrestling Trials held in Niagara, Canada, earning a spot for the Canadian Olympic team at the Olympic qualifiers. However, she was unable to secure a spot in the top 2 in her weight-class at both the 2020 Pan-American Olympic Qualification Tournament and the 2021 World Olympic Qualification Tournament, failing to qualify for the 2020 Summer Olympics as a result.

References

1993 births
Living people
Canadian female sport wrestlers
Sportspeople from Ontario
World Wrestling Championships medalists
Commonwealth Games medallists in wrestling
Commonwealth Games silver medallists for Canada
Wrestlers at the 2022 Commonwealth Games
20th-century Canadian women
21st-century Canadian women
Medallists at the 2022 Commonwealth Games